David Gerson (born in Toronto) is a Canadian film producer. His film Omar was nominated for the Academy Award for Best International Feature Film. He previously worked at Focus Features. He has attempted to mount a film adaptation of The Corrections.

Gerson graduated from Columbia University in 2008.

Filmography
 Omar, (2013)
 Superpai, (2015)
 Skiptrace, (2016)
 Dark Crimes, (2016)
 Georgetown, (2019)

References

Film producers from Ontario
Year of birth missing (living people)
Living people
Columbia College (New York) alumni